Ali Albwardy is a businessman from Dubai.

Biography

Business
In 1976, he founded Albwardy Investment. He serves as Chairman and Director of Pacman LLC.

Polo
He owns the Dubai Polo Country Club, which hosts the Cartier International Polo Challenge every year. He is also the patron of the Dubai Polo Team, where his son Rashid Albwardy is one of the players.

Between 2004 and 2007 Albwardy was president of Ham Polo Club in Richmond, London. The private grounds of Dubai Polo Team, owned by Albwardy, are still used for Ham's Dubai Trophy competition and the Roehampton Trophy. Albawardy's team were champions in the Dubai trophy which he presented in 2006 naming it after the Dubai Desert Palm Polo Club.

Albwardy continues to play polo regularly though less frequently in competition in the UK as his son Rashid patrons the team.

In December 2016, Albwardy played with the Argentinian prodigy Julio Otaegui Houston at La Dolfina Polo Club.

References

Living people
Businesspeople from Dubai
Polo players
Year of birth missing (living people)